Robert "Bob" Dunkley is a British competitive shooter who has won IPSC European Handgun Championship three times (1981, 1982 and 1984), and the IPSC British Handgun Championship 16 times. He currently works in his own firearm shop which he's had since 1984.

References 

IPSC shooters
British male sport shooters
21st-century British people